Amanda Duthie, Scottish-born Australian, is one of the leading figures in Australia's arts and culture industries and is currently the CEO/Creative Director of the Adelaide Film Festival and CEO of Hybrid World Adelaide.

The Adelaide Film Festival is a major screen and cultural event with its signature element being the Adelaide Film Festival Investment Fund. Duthie curates, commissions and manages all contracting for this Fund as well as the Festival.

Duthie has just launched a brand-new event in South Australia, Hybrid World Adelaide, a five-day event which covers industry as well as public facing events. Hybrid World Adelaide is a celebration of all digital technology.

Duthie currently sits on the Board of Adelaide Festival, South Australian Museum, Ukaria, is a Committee Member of the Jim Bettison & Helen James Award, and sits on the Advisory Board, ARC Centre of Excellence for the History of Emotions, University of Western Australia.

Career
Duthie began her career at SBS in 1991 working across a range of productions, focusing on programming and commissioning.  The Movie Show with Margaret and David introduced her to a range of movies beyond Hollywood. Working on programs such as Eat Carpet introduced her to the world of experimental filmmaking and the first works of major filmmakers.

She remained at SBS until 1999, when she moved to become associate producer of the PBS-BBC-ABC co-production Australia: Beyond the Fatal Shore written and presented by Australian historian, art critic and writer Robert Hughes.

In 2000 Duthie was an independent producer, delivering screen based work for the launch of the National Museum of Australia.

She then joined the New South Wales Film and Television Office (later Screen NSW) as senior project manager. In December 2003, Duthie joined ABC Television, as Commissioning Editor, Arts & Entertainment and was then appointed Head, Content Arts & Entertainment, serving from October 2008 to January 2012.

As Commissioner and Executive Producer, she delivered formats and one off programs as well as games, books, art installations, video and photo exhibitions and interactive content. These programs crossed all genres- arts, history, entertainment, comedy and youth.

Over nine years at the ABC, Duthie delivered an array of original, award-winning and high rating content across all ABC platforms including Hetti Perkins Art & Soul, Kitchen Cabinet with Annabel Crabb, The New Inventors, Betty Churcher's Hidden Treasures, At The Movies with Margaret and David, Spicks & Specks, The Gruen Transfer and Gruen Planet, Judith Lucy's Spiritual Journey, Adam Hills in Gordon Street Tonight, Shaun Micallef's Mad as Hell and various Chaser projects. Her arts programming slate included Artscape, At the Movies, First Tuesday Book Club, an ongoing series of ABC Live concerts, and The Bazura Project.

She remained at the ABC for nine years, leaving in December 2011 to join the Adelaide Film Festival as CEO and Creative Director.

In 2013 Duthie delivered her first Adelaide Film Festival, and the 2013 Adelaide Festival of Ideas. Over her six years in the role Duthie delivered eight major events including five Adelaide Film Festivals (2013, 2015, 2016 Rogue mini-fest, 2017 and 2018), the inaugural Hybrid World Adelaide in 2017 and again in 2018, and the 2013 Festival of Ideas.

In September 2018 it was announced Duthie would commence in the role of Head of Production, Development, Attraction and Studios at the South Australian Film Corporation, at the close of the 2018 Adelaide Film Festival.

Adelaide Film Festival
The inaugural Adelaide Film Festival director had been Katrina Sedgwick, who held the position from 2002 to 2012. She resigned to pursue other opportunities and ended up as ABC television's Head of Arts, Amanda Duthie's previous position (the two women had effectively swapped jobs).

In 2012 Duthie began her role as Director/CEO of Adelaide Film Festival. Soon after arriving in Adelaide she was appointed CEO of the 2013 Adelaide Festival of Ideas. Together with Sophie Black they delivered a robust and adventurous program of talks and events from Australian and international speakers. Audience numbers and partnerships achieved for this event outstripped all previous events.

She has welcomed other high calibre international and Australian industry leaders as festival guests, including all major international film festivals programmers from Toronto, Berlin, Sundance and Cannes.

In 2016, Duthie delivered a mini-fest event, between years of the biennial full Adelaide Film Festival event. The 2016 Adelaide Film Festival goes Rogue event featured the world premiere of Osamah Sami's Muslim rom-com Ali's Wedding, screened a special work in progress version of David Stratton's A Cinematic Life and treated audiences to the Australian premiere of the interactive and internationally acclaimed virtual reality work Collisions by Lynette Wallworth.

In 2017 Duthie was appointed CEO of the brand-new event in South Australia, Hybrid World Adelaide, a five-day event which covers industry as well as public facing events. It is a celebration of all digital technology. Delivered by the AFF team, Hybrid World Adelaide will be held at Tonsley Innovation Precinct from 4–8 October 2017, simultaneous to the 2017 Adelaide Film Festival, 5–15 October 2017.

Though a biennial event, Adelaide Film Festival will deliver a full festival event in both 2017 and 2018 alongside Hybrid World Adelaide.

In 2017 Duthie launched the Adelaide Film Festival's inaugural International VR Award in partnership with AFTRS.

In September 2018 Wakefield Press published Kin: An Extraordinary Australian Filmmaking Family, a book about Freda Glynn and her family, edited by Duthie.

Controversy

In June 2009, one of "her" shows, The Chaser's War on Everything, broadcast the infamous "Make a Realistic Wish Foundation" skit, which led to complaints and criticism. As a result, Duthie had her responsibility for comedy removed, but remained the Head of Arts & Entertainment, a punishment characterised by one commentator as “being whipped with a bit of limp lettuce”. ABC Managing Director Mark Scott explained the situation this way:
	 
"The segment should not have been broadcast. We recognise that it caused unnecessary and unreasonable hurt and offence to our viewers and the broader community and we have apologised for this. We have determined this was not a breakdown in our Editorial Policy processes but rather an error of judgement."
	 
Mr Scott said the processes are clear and amply set out in the ABC's Editorial Policies. "Where staff are concerned about the potential for satirical material to cause harm they should refer the matter to the next level of management. In this instance, the Head of Arts, Entertainment and Comedy reviewed the segment and did not refer it up. This was an error of judgement."
	 
The Chaser team expressed disappointment at the demotion, saying Duthie had been treated harshly. Glenn Dyer at Crikey' described the business as "something close to farce."

Boards and committees 
Amanda Duthie holds the following positions:
 Board Director & Advisory Committee, Ukaria (2014-current)
 Board Director, South Australian Museum (2017-current)
 Committee, Jim Bettison & Helen James Award (2014-current), funded through Perpetual, ADL Film Fest administers, a $50,000 annual philanthropy award
 Advisory Board, University of WA Centre of Excellence, History of Emotions  CRC (2011-current)
 Board Director, Festivals Adelaide (2011-2016), a peak group of the ten major South Australian events working towards a collective cultural vision and strategy for the state 
 Advisory Board, Premier's Council for Women (2015-2016). working to establish better representation of women in business in South Australia; committee member for the inaugural 50/50 networking event 
 Board Director, Adelaide Festival of Arts (2012-2016)
 Inaugural Board Member, Committee for Adelaide (2013-2015), established by Ian Smith (Bespoke Approach); the committee's goal is to drive capital investment and community growth

References

External links
 

Australian curators
Australian television producers
Australian women television producers
Film festival directors
Living people
Year of birth missing (living people)
Australian women curators